Francisco Oscar Pancho Lamolina (born October 25, 1950). is a former football (soccer) referee from Argentina.

He was an official at 1994 FIFA World Cup.

He was known in Argentine First Division for his laissez-faire style into the field, completely opposed to the strictness of Javier Castrilli's.

Even though he was highly regarded in the 1980s, towards the end of his career he was criticized for his style, that allowed much rudeness to go unpunished. His classic gesture was to simulate pushing a cart to suggest movement, sometimes (allegedly) accompanied by his saying siga, siga ("go on, go on"), which became a derogatory way of making allusion to this school of refereeing.

References

External links

Argentine football referees
Living people
1950 births
FIFA World Cup referees
Copa América referees
Place of birth missing (living people)
1994 FIFA World Cup referees